B. darwini may refer to:

 Berthelinia darwini, a snail species in the genus Berthelinia found in the Houtman Abrolhos
 Boursinidia darwini, a moth species
 Brachyleon darwini
 Bulimulus darwini, a tropical air-breathing land snail species

See also
 B. darwinii (disambiguation)
 Darwini (disambiguation)